An egg coffee is a Vietnamese drink traditionally prepared with egg yolks, sugar, condensed milk and robusta coffee. The drink is made by beating egg yolks with sugar and condensed milk, then extracting the coffee into the half of the cup, followed by a similar amount of "egg cream"⁠ ⁠— egg yolks which are heated and beaten, or whisked.

The drink is served in cafes throughout Vietnam, though it originates in Hanoi. The Giang Café  in Hanoi is known for serving the drink, which it makes with chicken egg yolk, coffee powder, condensed milk, and, optionally, cheese. The cup is sometimes served inside a bowl of hot water or set upon a small candle to retain its temperature. The son of the café's founder Nguyen Giang claims that his father developed the recipe for the drink when milk was scarce in Vietnam in the late 1940s, replacing milk with egg yolk.

Ingredients and preparation 
Ingredients for making coffee include fresh chicken eggs, sugar, milk, and coffee. The egg yolks are hand-whipped with milk and sugar, and then boiled. Hot or iced coffee is poured into the beaten eggs, which will form an aromatic foam. A teaspoon is provided in order to eat the foam before drinking the coffee at the bottom.

Egg coffee is contained in a small cup. To keep the drink warm, the waiter puts a cup of coffee in a bowl of warm water. After being poured over the cream made from eggs, the coffee at the bottom of the cup acquires a richer taste. In the past, eggs were just hand-beaten, so it took time and the foam of the eggs could not be achieved. Now, after the eggs have been smoothed with the machine, hot or iced coffee is added, together with cocoa eggs, egg white beans and matcha (tea powder) eggs. It can be served either hot or iced.

Non-Vietnamese "egg coffees"
There are other, different, recipes for coffee containing egg. 
Scandinavian-Style Coffee Brewed With Egg from Sweden is made by mixing coffee grounds with an egg and simmering, like cowboy coffee; the egg makes the grounds sink, leaving smooth coffee.
Egg Brandy Coffee from Sri Lanka
Cuban egg coffee
Kopi Talua from Indonesia.

Gallery

See also

 Vietnamese iced coffee
 Teh talua
 Egg soda
 Eggnog
 Zabaione
 Uovo sbattuto
 List of coffee drinks
 List of egg drinks

References

External links
 Tách cà phê trứng 'huyền thoại' của Hà Nội
 Cà phê trứng Hà Nội lên CNN: Điều bí mật trong ly cà phê 70 năm tuổi

Coffee drinks
Vietnamese cuisine
Vietnamese drinks
Eggs (food)
Mixed drinks